Ernest Luckman (5 March 1926 – July 1988) was an English professional rugby league footballer who played in the 1940s and 1950s.

Background
Ernest Luckman's birth was registered in Pontefract district, West Riding of Yorkshire, England, and he died aged 62 in Wakefield, West Yorkshire, England.

Playing career

County Cup Final appearances
Ernest Luckman played , in Wakefield Trinity's 17-3 victory over Keighley in the 1951 Yorkshire County Cup Final during the 1951–52 season at Fartown Ground, Huddersfield on Saturday 27 October 1951.

Club career
In addition, prior to the 1949–50 season, the archaic field-goal was also still a valid means of scoring points.

Genealogical information
Ernest Luckman's marriage to Elizabeth (née Micklefield) was registered during first ¼ 1956 in Wakefield district.

References

External links
Search for "Luckman" at rugbyleagueproject.org

1926 births
1988 deaths
English rugby league players
Featherstone Rovers players
Rugby league centres
Rugby league fullbacks
Rugby league players from Pontefract
Wakefield Trinity players